Jordão da Encarnação Tackey Diogo (born 12 November 1985) is a São Toméan professional footballer who plays as a left-back or a left midfielder.

Club career
Born in Lisbon of São Tomé and Príncipe descent, Diogo made his senior debut in 2004 with A.D. Carregado in the fourth division, on loan from F.C. Alverca. He moved to England after one season, going on to play semi-professional football in the country with Chelmsford City, Lewes and Aveley.

Diogo had his first top-flight experience in 2008, joining Iceland's Knattspyrnufélag Reykjavíkur. He was part of the squad that won the national championship in 2011 but only appeared in two league games, also spending two years on loan to Greek club Panserraikos F.C. where he was sidelined for two months with a knee injury contracted in early November 2010.

On 23 August 2012, already as a free agent, Diogo signed for three seasons with Panachaiki F.C. in the Greek second division. He competed mostly in the country's Super League the following years after a fleeting spell at Vitória F.C. in Portugal, representing in the competition Panthrakikos FC, PAE Kerkyra and Levadiakos FC.

International career
In October 2015, Diogo was called up by São Tomé and Príncipe for a 2018 FIFA World Cup qualifier against Ethiopia. He made his debut on the 8th, playing the full 90 minutes in a 1–0 home win.

References

External links

1985 births
Living people
Portuguese people of São Tomé and Príncipe descent
People with acquired São Tomé and Príncipe citizenship
Portuguese footballers
São Tomé and Príncipe footballers
Footballers from Lisbon
Association football defenders
Association football midfielders
Casa Pia A.C. players
F.C. Alverca players
Vitória F.C. players
National League (English football) players
Chelmsford City F.C. players
Lewes F.C. players
Aveley F.C. players
Needham Market F.C. players
Úrvalsdeild karla (football) players
Knattspyrnufélag Reykjavíkur players
Super League Greece players
Football League (Greece) players
Panserraikos F.C. players
Panachaiki F.C. players
Panthrakikos F.C. players
PAE Kerkyra players
Levadiakos F.C. players
São Tomé and Príncipe international footballers
Portuguese expatriate footballers
São Tomé and Príncipe expatriate footballers
Expatriate footballers in England
Expatriate footballers in Iceland
Expatriate footballers in Greece
Portuguese expatriate sportspeople in England
Portuguese expatriate sportspeople in Iceland
Portuguese expatriate sportspeople in Greece